Dicentra cucullaria, Dutchman's britches, or Dutchman's breeches, is a perennial herbaceous plant, native to rich woods of eastern North America, with a disjunct population in the Columbia Basin.

The common name Dutchman's breeches derives from their white flowers that look like white breeches.

Description
The rootstock is a cluster of small pink to white teardrop-shaped bulblets (more precisely, miniature tubers). They are trifoliate, with finely divided leaflets.

Unlike the closely related Dicentra canadensis (squirrel corn), the flowers lack fragrance.

The capsule splits in half when the seeds are ripe. The seeds are kidney-shaped, with a faint netlike pattern. Each one has a fleshy organ called an elaiosome that attracts ants. Dutchman's breeches is one of many plants whose seeds are spread by ants, a process called myrmecochory. The ants take the seeds to their nest, where they eat the elaiosomes, and put the seeds in their nest debris, where they are protected until they germinate. They also get the added bonus of growing in a medium made richer by the ant nest debris.

The leaves and flower stems die back in late spring after the seed has ripened, and the bulblets remain dormant through the summer. In the fall, starch in the bulblets is converted to sugar, and the beginnings of the next spring's leaves and flowers develop below ground.

The western populations have sometimes been separated as Dicentra occidentalis on the basis of often somewhat coarser growth, but do not differ from many eastern plants in the Blue Ridge Mountains of Virginia.

Ecology
Dicentra cucullaria is dependent on bumblebees (especially Bombus bimaculatus, a common eastern North American species) for cross-pollination.  In fact, the flower structure and mechanism by which it is pollinated indicate that it is adapted for bumblebees, which can separate the outer and inner petals of the flower.  They will then use their front legs to expose the stigma, stamen, and anthers.  Shortly afterwards, they will sweep pollen in a forward stroke by utilizing their middle legs, before leaving the flower to return to the colony with the pollen.  In this way, D. cucullaria is pollinated as the bees move from plant to plant, and the bumblebee meets its dietary needs.

The effect of a hallucinogenic compound contained in the plant on livestock has led ranchers to refer to it as 'Staggerweed'.

Cultivation
Dutchman's breeches was likely introduced to cultivation in England when Philip Miller introduced it to the Chelsea Physic Garden. Miller likely received it from John Bartram. The species was, however, not mentioned in American horticultural literature until the early 19th century.

Two clones with pink flowers have received cultivar names: 'Pittsburg', which turns pink under certain conditions, and 'Pink Punk', collected by Henrik Zetterlund on Saddle Mountain in Oregon, is more consistently pink.

Medicinal uses
Native Americans and early white practitioners considered this plant useful for syphilis, skin conditions and as a blood purifier. Dutchman's breeches contains several alkaloids that may have effects on the brain and heart.

However, D. cucullaria may be toxic and causes contact dermatitis in some people.

References

cucullaria
Ephemeral plants
Flora of North America
Plants described in 1753
Taxa named by Carl Linnaeus
Flora without expected TNC conservation status